Cylichna gouldii is a species of very small sea snail, a small bubble snail, a marine gastropod mollusk in the family Cylichnidae.

This bubble snail lives in the Western Atlantic Ocean and has been found in Nova Scotia, Maine and Massachusetts.

References

 Malacolog info

Cylichnidae
Gastropods described in 1839